Delgrosso is a surname. Notable people with the surname include:

 Ashly DelGrosso (born 1982), American dancer
 Frank Delgrosso (1899–1981), New Zealand rugby league player
 James Delgrosso (1943–2009), American politician